Mokrá Lúka is a village and municipality in Revúca District in the Banská Bystrica Region of Slovakia.

External links
 
 
Mokrá Lúka village website 
https://web.archive.org/web/20080111223415/http://www.statistics.sk/mosmis/eng/run.html

Villages and municipalities in Revúca District